Student Selection and Placement System (ÖSYS) or Higher Education Foundations Examination (YKS), formerly Higher Education Examination Undergraduate Placement Examination, (YGS-LYS), is a standardized test for the admission to higher education in Turkey administered by ÖSYM. Within the Turkish education system, the only way to enter a university is through this exam. 1,692,000 high school graduates took the exam in 2011 and 2,255,386 in 2016. It is a multiple choice exam (5 options). It has two parts as Core Proficiency Test-Advanced Proficiency Test (TYT-AYT).

History 
ÖSS was first applied in the late 1960s. Before then each university selected their students via their own criteria. However, with the increasing number of youth and the overloaded applications, the universities gathered and founded "Yüksekögretim Kurulu", the Higher Education Council, and a subdivision named ÖSYM, "Student Selection and Placement Center", which began to operate the central ÖSS, Student Selection Examination.

ÖSS and ÖYS between 1980–1999 
In 1980 the number of the exams were increased to two, namely the ÖSS and ÖYS. If a student did not achieve the specified grade in ÖSS, they did not have the right to enter ÖYS, and thus, lost their chance to be accepted to a university. ÖSS consisted of questions about the ninth grade curriculum, and ÖYS was a test on the tenth and eleventh grade curriculum. ÖSS eliminated the students on the basis of the grade they had received in the exam, and ÖYS placed the students to the universities they wanted. This system continued until 1999 when ÖYS was dropped and the system reverted to the single ÖSS exam, with the same format and same questions.

ÖSS between 1999–2005 
The ÖSS exam was a 180-minute exam with 180 questions testing students' analytical thinking and problem-solving abilities, as well as knowledge of the high school curriculum. Each student was expected to answer the entirety of questions, which spanned the following subject areas: mathematics, geometry, physics, chemistry, biology, Turkish language, history, geography and philosophy.

A foreign language exam, the YDS, was conducted a week after the ÖSS. It was composed of foreign language questions in English, French, and German. As in ÖSS, each student solved the questions of the foreign language department they had chosen at high school.

The maximum score that a student could attain on the ÖSS was 380,300 being the student's achievement on the test score, and 80 being a student's high school score based on their GPA, graduation rank, and school's past success on the ÖSS exam.

If a student selected a university department related to their studies at high school (namely applied sciences, social sciences, or foreign languages), their score was multiplied by 0.8. If a student preferred to study at a different department from their high school concentration, their score was multiplied by 0.3.

ÖSS between 2006–2009 
Students who took ÖSS in 2006 saw some major changes. The exam now lasted 195 minutes, and had two parts: ÖSS 1 and ÖSS 2. ÖSS 1 has 120 questions on the ninth and tenth grade curriculum. There are 30 Turkish, 30 Math 1, 30 Science 1, 30 Social Sciences 1 questions. Each student has to answer every question regardless of their 
department.

ÖSS 2 is composed of 120 questions out of which students have to answer 60. Students at the social sciences department have to answer the social sciences-2 and literature-social test questions. Students at the applied sciences departments have to answer the applied sciences-2 and mathematics-2 questions. The students at the foreign languages departments have to answer the whole ÖSS 1 and foreign language questions; which are tested separately in another exam named YDS-foreign language exam. The Turkish-Math students must answer the literature-social and mathematics-2 questions.

YGS-LYS (2010–2018) 
Beginning in 2010, the exam is now similar to the ÖSS-ÖYS system in terms of topics. Students take the Transition to Higher Education Examination (YGS) in March. Those who pass the YGS are then entitled to take the Undergraduate Placement Examination (LYS), the second-round exam in the new system taking place in June. Students who only take the YGS, in which students have to answer 160 questions (Turkish language (40), maths (40), philosophy (8), geography (12), history (15), religion culture and morality knowledge (5), biology (13), physics (14) and chemistry (13)) in 160 minutes, are able to apply for associate degree programs. There are five LYS sessions whereas the previous university entrance system, the ÖSS, was held once in a year throughout the country.

TYT - AYT (2018-present) 
The Higher Education Institutions Examination (YKS) is conducted by the Measurement, Selection and Placement Center ÖSYM in order to enable the students to be placed in higher education programs and to be placed according to their preferences.

Higher Education Institutions Exam (YKS):

YKS is a 3-session exam. All applicants applying to YKS are required to attend the Basic Proficiency Test (TYT). Other sessions are optional.

The first session is the Basic Proficiency Test (TYT).  The test  is carried out in the following fields.

-Turkish language (40 questions)

-Liberal arts (25 questions)

-Mathematics (40 questions)

-Science (20 questions)

In the 2nd Field Qualification Tests (AYT), the candidates are asked the following four areas:

-Turkish Language and Literature and Social Sciences I Test (Turkish Language and Literature, History I and Geography I)

-Social Sciences II Test (History II, Geography II, Philosophy Group)

-Mathematic Test

-Science Test

The third session is the Foreign Language Test (English) (YDT).

Candidates with a score of 150 or higher in the TYT will be able to choose higher education programs that take students with TYT points. Candidates who scored 150 or more in TYT, SAY, EA, DIL scores of 180 and above, with these point types and students with undergraduate degree programs with TYT score will be able to choose the undergraduate programs.

Candidates who have a score of 180 or more in TYT have the right to choose only associate degree programs. These candidates do not have the right to choose undergraduate, undergraduate and graduate programs with SAY (Maths and Science), VERBAL (Turkish, Social Sciences (history II, geography II and religion/philosophy II), EA (Maths, Turkish and History I and Geography I) and LANGUAGE (English, French, German, Russian and Arabic) score.

In order to apply for higher education programs that take students with a special aptitude test, TYT score should be min. 180 and above (for disabled students 100 and above)

Results are announced in the second half of June and students have to make their university preferences by the last week of July. They are placed in courses according to their scores and this is announced at the end of August. In Turkish educational system, schools follow a curriculum completely decided by the state, which makes it easier to hold nationwide exams

Criticism of ÖSYS 
"Life = 180 minutes?" is a slogan used by TED (Turkish Education Association) in 2005 in order to criticize the ÖSS system for attempting to encompass all the work of a student throughout their 12 years of academic life in a 3-hour multiple choice exam. This is arguably unfair; however, the president of the ÖSYM exam board states that "ÖSS is the only available university entrance system until the number of people who apply to universities is lowered."

The most significant reason why ÖSS is being conducted instead of personal interviews is the fact that the total capacity of universities is 450,000 while the number of candidates wanting to study at a college is 1.6 million and is increasing every year.

For a student, the education they receive at school is seen as not enough to succeed in ÖSS. Therefore, there is a huge sector in Turkey of private evening and weekend cram schools ("dershane") all around the country. These institutions prepare students solely for exams, including university entrance. All "dershane"s compete with each other in order to create the "champion", the one to score the highest mark in Turkey. The dershane sector is bolstered every year by huge media interest as the results of the exam are disclosed and the students who rank in the top few appear on TV and in the newspapers. In 2011 ÖSYM is taking steps to limit this interest by charging newspapers 150,000 TL for the past exam questions, while forbidding television channels other than the state-owned TRT from broadcasting the questions.

See also 
 Education in Turkey

References
Sources
Bahar, Mustafa, "Academic achievement of Turkish selective schools in national exams of HSEE and UEE with respect to test types and gender", The Asia-Pacific Education Researcher, Vol. 22, No. 4, Oct. 2012

Notes

External links 
 ÖSYM
 YÖK

Education in Turkey
School examinations
Standardized tests